The Atlantic Estuarine Research Society (AERS) is an association of researchers and students with an interest in estuarine and coastal environmental issues and policies. The Atlantic Estuarine Research Society (AERS) brings together students, scientists, managers, and educators from the states of DE, MD, NC, NJ, PA, and VA and Washington, DC to discuss estuarine and coastal environmental issues and policies. It is our intent to a foster broader interest in our environment by increasing public awareness of current issues.

It is affiliated with the  national Coastal and Estuarine Research Federation which sponsors biennial conferences  and produces a journal, Estuaries and Coasts.

See also 

Estuary
Chesapeake Bay
Long Island Sound

References 
Andrews, J. D. 1952, The Atlantic Estuarine Research Society. Science 116:153-154
Smithsonian Institution Archives of AERS records

Estuaries
Water organizations in the United States